The Aurora Cavalry is a defunct basketball team from the International Basketball League.  They were based in Aurora, Colorado and played only one season in 2006. The team played its home games in a local high school gymnasium.

Cavalry Players

Coaches
Dejon Jernagin, 2006 (10-7)
A.B. Maxey, 2006 (3-0)

All-Stars
2006
 Sneed Deaderick, G
 Phillip Hillstock, F
 D.J. Stelly, F

Team Record

Franchise History
The Cavalry was created as an expansion team of the International Basketball League in September 2005.  Initially named the Aurora Outlaws, the franchise became the Aurora Cavalry and from its inception became an above-average team in the league.  The Cavalry tipped off their first game on March 31, 2006, beating crosstown team Colorado Crossover 140-132.  Beginning their existence with a 5-game winning streak, Aurora, led by coach and former Harlem Globetrotter Dejon Jernagin (later replaced by A.B. Maxey), quickly gained a reputation for a balanced attack which was hard for their opponents to counter at first, but they went on to lose seven of their final fifteen games - four in a row in blowout fashion.  Injuries to some players reportedly was to blame, while others left for better opportunities elsewhere.  However, the Cavalry managed to finish 2006 in 4th place out of 12 teams in the Western Conference and 7th overall.

The Cavalry have since folded.

Related Links/Sources
Team page on IBL website

International Basketball League teams
Defunct basketball teams in the United States
Sports in Aurora, Colorado
Basketball teams in Colorado